Busy Tonight is an American late-night talk show hosted by Busy Philipps that aired from October 28, 2018 to May 16, 2019 on E!.

Premise
Busy Tonight features "everyone's favorite unfiltered Hollywood best friend giving her hilarious and outspoken opinions on the latest pop culture stories and trending topics with candid celebrity guest interviews and original comedic segments."

Production
On May 1, 2018, it was announced that E! had given a series order to a new late-night talk show to be hosted by actress Busy Philipps. Executive producers were expected to include Julie Darmody, Eric Gurian and Philipps. Production companies involved with the series were slated to consist of Little Stranger.

On August 16, 2018, it was announced that Caissie St. Onge had been hired to serve as the series' showrunner as well as an additional executive producer. Additionally, it was announced that the series would premiere on October 28, 2018 at 10 PM and that episodes of the series were expected to air each week from Sunday to Wednesday at 10 PM EST. On October 25, 2018, it was reported that Tina Fey and David Miner had joined the series as executive producers and that Wilshire Studios would serve as an additional production company. Furthermore, it was revealed that first week guests would include Mindy Kaling, Vanessa Hudgens, Kristen Bell and Megan Mullally along with appearances by Jimmy Kimmel, Fred Armisen, and Andy Cohen. Other first season guests were expected to include Julia Roberts, Kim Kardashian, Tracee Ellis Ross, Camila Mendes, John Stamos, Olivia Munn, Beth Behrs, Lauren Graham, Jesse Tyler Ferguson, Emily Ratajkowski, Taran Killam, David Alan Grier, Tess Holliday and Tom Lenk.

On January 3, 2019, it was reported that the show would be moving to a new time slot at 11 PM EST beginning on January 7, 2019. Additionally, it was reported that the show would air a live television special titled "Busy Tonight Live: Golden Globes After Party" that was to broadcast immediately following the conclusion of the 76th Golden Globe Awards. Guests for the special were expected to include Whitney Cummings, Karamo Brown, River Butcher and Ira Madison III.

On May 5, 2019, Philipps announced that the series had been cancelled, with all remaining episodes airing until May 16. Philipps also stated the series would be shopped to other networks but it was not picked up.

Episodes

2018

2019

Reception
In a negative review, Varietys Daniel D'Addario discussed the show's lack of identity in its first week saying, "talk demands a crystal-clear point-of-view and Busy Tonight has yet to find that, making its endless references to the language of self-help and its production excesses like the nightly lullaby feel like the antic search for a personality, not the expression of one. Some things about television shows we’ve seen before are worth keeping." In another unfavorable critique, The Ringers Rob Harvilla was equally critical saying, "Busy Tonight is tough sledding unless you're a superfan of Philipps, social-media geniuses, or the adorable baby-deer stumbles of new talk shows."

References

External links

2018 American television series debuts
2010s American late-night television series
2019 American television series endings
English-language television shows
E! original programming